This is a list of universities in Togo. 

 Atlantic African Oriental Multicultural (ATAFOM) University International
 African Union University, Togo
 African University of science administration and commercial studies. IAEC UNIVERSITY TOGO
Maryam Abacha American University Niger, Togo Campus
Centre de perfectionnement aux Technique Economique et Commerciales Université (CPTEC UNIVERSITÉ) Avepozo Lome, Togo
IHERIS University,Togo
Catholic University of West Africa
Ecole supérieure de formation professionnelle (FIMAC)
Université Bilingue Libre du Togo
University of Kara
University of Richard of Togo
University of Lomé
University of Science and Technology of Togo
DEFOP University of Technology

References

Universities and colleges in Togo
Togo
Togo
Universities